"Clockwork" is the fourth single by American rapper Juelz Santana from his second studio album What the Game's Been Missing! (2005).

Music video
The music video for the song was directed by Dale "Rage" Resteghini.

Charts

References

2005 songs
2005 singles
Juelz Santana songs
Def Jam Recordings singles
Songs written by Juelz Santana
Music videos directed by Dale Resteghini